Jacob Thomas (born February 14, 1977 in Austin, Texas) is a former American soccer midfielder who last played for the Columbus Crew in Major League Soccer.

Career 
After one season of college soccer, playing for the Saint Louis University, Thomas played for the Austin Lone Stars in the USISL. In 1999 Thomas went to Germany and joined Dritte Liga club Eintracht Braunschweig where he played for the next five years, including one season in the 2. Bundesliga. In 2004, he moved to VfB Lübeck, where he remained for two seasons. On March 28, 2006 he was signed by the Columbus Crew. He was released after the 2009 season.

Personal life 
Thomas married his wife Franziska, the daughter of former Eintracht Braunschweig player Franz Merkhoffer, during his time in Braunschweig. Thomas has two sons, both soccer players.

References

External links
 

1977 births
Living people
American expatriate soccer players
American expatriate soccer players in Germany
Saint Louis Billikens men's soccer players
Soccer players from Austin, Texas
USISL players
Austin Lone Stars players
VfB Lübeck players
Eintracht Braunschweig players
Columbus Crew players
2. Bundesliga players
Major League Soccer players
Association football forwards
Association football midfielders
American soccer players